Gilbert House is the building in Stanley, Falkland Islands, where the Legislative Assembly of the Falkland Islands meets.  It is located in Ross Road across the street from the Malvina House Hotel.  Each member of the Legislative Assembly has an office in Gilbert House.

Gilbert House is a listed building.

References

External links
 Jane Cameron National Archives - Glbert/Dockyard Cottage

Buildings and structures in Stanley, Falkland Islands
Buildings and structures in the Falkland Islands